High explosive nuclear effects testing comprises large scale field tests using conventional high explosives as alternatives to atmospheric nuclear testing.

Background
When the Limited Test Ban Treaty came into effect in 1963, nuclear testing in the atmosphere was prohibited. However, alternatives to atmospheric nuclear testing were required to continue the study of nuclear weapons effects. These would allow obtaining data related to air-blast, ground-shock, structure-response data, bio-medical effects, and other various phenomena. Large scale field tests using conventional high explosives were devised to this end.

Events
The following is a list of such events with yields of more than 1000 pounds.

See also 
 Largest artificial non-nuclear explosions
 List of nuclear weapons tests

References 

Nuclear weapons testing